God willing is a phrase that could mean:
"If the Lord wills", an expression found in James 4 in the Christian Bible.
 Deo volente, Latin phrase signed at the end of a letter wishing for the safe arrival of the letter
 Insha'Allah, Arabic phrase used when referring to future events
 God Willing (2006 film), 2006 Swedish film
 God Willing (2015 film), 2015 Italian film
 God Willing (soundtrack), soundtrack to the 2006 Swedish film
 God Will'n, mixtape by American rapper Juelz Santana
"God Willing", a song by Lowgold from Keep Music Miserable
"God Willing", a song by Pet Shop Boys from Fundamental